The 2020–21 Louisiana Tech Bulldogs basketball team represented Louisiana Tech University during the 2020–21 NCAA Division I men's basketball season. The team was led by sixth-year head coach Eric Konkol, and played their home games at Thomas Assembly Center in Ruston, Louisiana as a members of the West Division of Conference USA. The Bulldogs finished first in the West Division, but lost in the tournament to North Texas. They received a bid to the National Invitation Tournament, where they lost to Mississippi State, but then defeated Colorado State in the third-place game to win third place.

Previous season
The Bulldogs finished the 2019–20 season 22–8, 13–5 in C-USA play to finish in a tie for second place. They were set to be the No. 3 seed in the C-USA tournament. However, they C-USA Tournament was canceled amid the COVID-19 pandemic.

Roster

Schedule and results

|-
!colspan=12 style=|Regular season

|-
!colspan=9 style=| Conference USA tournament

|-
!colspan=12 style=| NIT

See also
 2020–21 Louisiana Tech Lady Techsters basketball team

Notes

References

Louisiana Tech Bulldogs basketball seasons
Louisiana Tech
Louisiana Tech basketball
Louisiana Tech basketball
Louisiana Tech